Da is a 1988 film directed by Matt Clark, produced by Julie Corman, and starring Martin Sheen, Barnard Hughes, reprising his Tony Award-winning Broadway performance, and William Hickey. The screenplay was written by Irish playwright and journalist Hugh Leonard, who adapted it from his 1978 play Da, with additional material from his autobiographical book Home Before Night.

Plot
Charlie is a playwright in New York who must travel to Ireland to oversee the burial of his father, "Da".  During his time there he visits his childhood home, and is visited by the spirit of his deceased father.  Charlie then travels down memory lane, reliving both happy and sad memories.

Cast 
 Barnard Hughes as Nick Tynan
 Martin Sheen as Charlie Tynan
 William Hickey as Drumm
 Karl Hayden as Young Charlie Tynan
 Doreen Hepburn as Maggie Tynan
 Hugh O'Conor as Boy Charlie Tynan
 Ingrid Craigie as Polly
 Joan O'Hara as Mrs. Prynne
 Jill Doyle as Mary "The Yellow Peril" Tate
 Peter Hanly as Young Oliver

Reception
Roger Ebert said, "Da is in many ways a predictable movie; we know from the beginning more or less where it will have to go, and so it does."

References

External links 
 
 
 
 

1988 films
1988 drama films
American drama films
Films scored by Elmer Bernstein
American films based on plays
Films set in Ireland
Films produced by Julie Corman
Films with screenplays by Hugh Leonard
1988 directorial debut films
1980s English-language films
1980s American films